Coronella is a genus of harmless snakes in the family Colubridae. The genus is endemic to Europe, North Africa and West Asia. Two species are currently recognized as being valid.

Common names: Smooth snakes.

Description
The head is only slightly distinct from the neck, and the pupil is round. The teeth of the upper jaw increase in size towards the rear of the mouth. The body is almost cylindrical and covered with smooth scales. The subcaudals are paired.

Behavior
Coronella species are terrestrial and rather secretive, spending much of their time under cover.

Feeding
The diet of snakes of the genus Coronella is made up mainly of lizards and the young of other snakes, as well as small rodents, especially young rodents still in the nest. They have often been described as constrictors, although there is no good evidence for this. Street (1979) notes that prey is held firmly in its coils, but only for the purpose of restraint rather than to kill it.

Geographic range
Species in the genus Coronella are found in Europe, North Africa and West Asia.

Species

*) Not including the nominate subspecies (typical form).

Taxonomy
The genus Coronella is closely related to the American kingsnakes of the genus Lampropeltis, and both genera were once classified within the same genus.

References

Further reading
Laurenti JN (1768). Specimen medicum, exhibens synopsin reptilium emendatam cum experimentis circa venena et antidota reptilium austriacorum. Vienna: "Joan. Thom. Nob. de Trattnern". 214 pp. + Plates I-V. (Coronella, new genus, p. 84). (in Latin).

External links
Southern smooth snake, Coronella girondica at Reptiles & Amphibians of Europe. Accessed 30 October 2006.

Colubrids
Snake genera
Taxa named by Josephus Nicolaus Laurenti